Maurya Lok Complex or Maurya Lok is one of the oldest and major business districts and shopping areas of Patna, India. It contains shopping complexes, restaurants and many government offices. It is controlled by Patna Municipal Corporation.

See also

Frazer Road
Bailey Road
List of central business districts and financial districts in India

References

Shopping malls in Patna
Shopping malls established in 1984
1984 establishments in Bihar
20th-century architecture in India